Richard Chapman may refer to:

Richard Chapman (cricketer) (1918–2004), South African cricketer
Richard Chapman (MP) (died 1580), Member of Parliament (MP) for Bath
Richard Chapman (musician) (born 1956), British guitarist, composer and author
Richard Chapman (shipwright) (1520–c. 1592), owner of a private shipyard at Deptford
Dick Chapman (1911–1978), American amateur golfer